Sudurpashchim Pradesh is a province of Nepal located in westernmost part of Nepal. It is surrounded by Tibet of China in Northwest, Uttrakhand of India in West, Uttar Pradesh of India in South, Karnali Province in East and North. Lumbini Province touches it in South. Dhangadhi is the capital city of the province.

Previously, Sudurpashchim Province was a development region of Nepal with the same territory. Far-Western Development Region was official name of this region. Sudurpashchimanchal was Nepali term of Far-Western region. The 9 districts were subgrouped into two zones, Mahakali and Seti.

Administrative structure
Sudurpashchim is divided into 9 districts and districts are subdivided into Municipalities.

Districts
Sudurpashchim is divided into 9 districts.

Municipality
There are two types of Municipality:
Urban Municipality (Nagarpalika)
Sub-Metropolitan City
Municipality
Rural Municipality (Gaunpalika)

Sub-Metropolitan City
There is only 1 sub-metropolitan city in Sudurpashchim

Municipalities
There are 33 municipalities in Sudurpashchim.

Rural Municipality
There are 54 rural municipalities in Sudurpashchim Province.

Judiciary

High court

Dipayal High Court is the high court of Sudurpashchim. The high court established according to the new constitution of Nepal. Article 139 of the constitution says “there shall be a High Court in each state”. Article 300 (3) : The High Courts set forth in Article 139 shall 
be established no later than one year after the date of 
commencement of this Constitution. The Appellate Courts 
existing at the time of commencement of this Constitution 
shall be dissolved after the establishment of such Courts.

Government of Nepal transformed the existing appellate courts in Dipayal on 14 September 2016. As per the government decision, there will be extended bench in Mahendranagar under the high court in Dipayal.

Prakash Dhungana has been appointed as the chief judge of Dipayal High Court in Sudurpashchim.

District court

Clause 148, 149, 150 and 151 of Constitution of Nepal, 2015 defines District Courts, appointment, qualification, terms and remuneration of chief justices.

There are 9 District courts in Sudurpashchim. Each district has one District court.

Legislature

Pradesh Sabha of Sudurpashchim is the unicameral legislative assembly.

As per the CDC (Constituency Delimitation Commission) report, Sudurpashchim has 32 provincial assembly seats under FPTP.

References

External links
http://supremecourt.gov.np/court/mahendranagarhc Dipayal Highcourt

Sudurpashchim Province
Subdivisions of Nepal